Andreea Cristina Popa (born 3 June 2000) is a Romanian handballer for Minaur Baia Mare and the Romanian national team.

She represented Romania at the 2020 European Women's Handball Championship.

As a junior, she finished fifth in the 2019 Junior European Championship.

International honours   
Youth Mediterranean Games:
Gold Medalist: 2017
Youth European Olympic Festival:
Silver Medalist: 2017

Individual awards 
 All-Star Left Back of the Youth Mediterranean Games: 2017

Personal life
Popa's parents are both physical education teachers. She started playing handball under the coaching guidance of her mother Dorina Popa.

References
 

2000 births
Living people
Sportspeople from Bucharest
Romanian female handball players
CS Minaur Baia Mare (women's handball) players